The W*ING World Tag Team Championship was a tag team championship contested in both Wrestling International New Generations and International Wrestling Association. The titles were established and won around July 1992 and were active until July 24, 2004 when they were abandoned. Ryo Miyake suffered an injury in the summer of 2004 and "Dr. Death" Steve Williams's throat cancer rapidly worsened during the same time frame, both being unable to defend the titles. There have been a total of 14 reigns shared between 11 different teams. Williams and Miyake were the last champions.

Title history

References

Hardcore wrestling championships
Tag team wrestling championships
International Wrestling Association of Japan